Wally Paterson (23 June 1928 – 27 July 2006) was an Australian wrestler. He competed in the men's Greco-Roman middleweight at the 1956 Summer Olympics.

References

External links
 

1928 births
2006 deaths
Australian male sport wrestlers
Olympic wrestlers of Australia
Wrestlers at the 1956 Summer Olympics
Place of birth missing